The Castle of Siba, Siba castle is one of the most remarkable examples of fortified structures surrounded by trench in Kukherd District, Hormozgan Province in south Iran.

Location

Siba castle was a squared fortified structure 1000 from Kukherd and on a hill above the palm oasis south-west of Kukherd, which added remarkably to its altitude and height. The length of its interface from the south is about 114 metres, while its southern interface extends over 112.5 metres. The structure was near the monuments of ancient bath of Siba.

History

The history of Siba castle goes back to the Sassanid era (226–651 CE). It was the center of government of that area. It acted as fortified military base for some time and was surrounded by a huge trench for protection. A trench was an ancient defensive strategic feature to defend the cities, castles and the forts in Persia before Islamic era.

This gigantic structure was considered a traditional defensive ancient landmark like other landmarks at that time such as huge city gates, cellars, security tunnels and underground military storages. The Castle of Siba was maintained until 1163-1192. Unfortunately it was destroyed by an earthquake in Kukherd and then by a flood in 1367 which destroyed the rest of the castle.

	

Bastak 
Bandar Lengeh
Hormozgān
Castle
AL madani
Paraw Kukherd
The Historic Bath of Siba
Sassanid family tree — of the Sasanian (Sassanid) dynasty

References 

 :ar: قلعة سيبة Arabic Wikipedia.
 :fa: قلعه سیبه Persian Wikipedia.
2.	الكوخردى ، محمد ، بن يوسف، (كُوخِرد حَاضِرَة اِسلامِيةَ عَلي ضِفافِ نَهر مِهران) الطبعة الثالثة ،دبى: سنة 199۷ للميلاد **Mohammed Kookherdi (1997) Kookherd, an Islamic civil at Mehran river,  third edition: Dubai
3.	محمدیان، کوخری، محمد ، “ (به یاد کوخرد) “، ج1. ج2. چاپ اول، دبی: سال انتشار 2003 میلادی Mohammed Kookherdi Mohammadyan (2003), Beyade Kookherd, third edition : Dubai.
4.محمدیان، کوخردی ، محمد ،  «شهرستان بستک و بخش کوخرد»  ، ج۱. چاپ اول، دبی: سال انتشار ۲۰۰۵ میلادی Mohammed Kookherdi Mohammadyan (2005), Shahrestan  Bastak & Bakhshe Kookherd, First edition : Dubai.
5.	Peter Jackson and Lawrence Lockhart (Ed) (1986), Vol. 6th,  The Cambridge History of Iran: Cambridge University Press
5.Human Anthropology in Persia
6.محمدیان، کوخری، محمد. (وصف کوخرد)  ج1. چاپ دوم، دبی: سال انتشار 1998 میلادی Mohammed Kookherdi Mohammadyan (1998), Wasf Kookherd, second  edition : Dubai
7.محمدیان ، کوخردی، محمد ،  « مشایخ مدنی »   ، چاپ دوم، دبی:   سال انتشار ۲۰۰۲ میلادی Mohammed Kookherdi Mohammadyan (2002), Mashaykh Madani, second  edition : Dubai
8. اطلس گیتاشناسی استان‌های ایران [Atlas Gitashenasi Ostanhai Iran] (Gitashenasi Province Atlas of Iran)
9. درگاه فهرست آثار ملی ایران

External links 
  Kookherd website.

Sasanian castles
Castles in Iran
Kukherd District
Archaeological sites in Iran
Monuments and memorials in Iran
Buildings and structures in Kukherd District
National works of Iran